A derived set may refer to:
Derived set (mathematics), a construction in point-set topology
Derived row, a concept in musical set theory